Morpeth is a railway station on the East Coast Main Line, which runs between  and . It is owned by Network Rail and managed by Northern Trains.

History 
The station was opened by the Newcastle and Berwick Railway on 1 March 1847. It was designed by Benjamin Green in the Scottish Baronial style and retains its original station buildings.

A severe ninety degree curve in the line of the railway immediately to the south of the station has been the site of four serious rail accidents, two of them fatal.

Blyth and Tyne Railway 
Another station was opened by the Blyth and Tyne Railway on 1 April 1858 and closed 24 May 1880. From the opening of their line in 1862 until 1872. The B&T line to Bedlington lost its passenger trains in April 1950 (although occasional summer services between Scotland and the North Eastern coastal resorts continued operating over it until the 1960s), but it remains in use for freight and may have its passenger trains restored in the future (as an extension of the current local stopping service) - the South East Northumberland Rail User Group is currently campaigning for this. The current local service from Newcastle that terminates here uses the connection onto the B&T line north of the station to reverse and layover clear of the main line between trips.

Passenger trains over the old NBR line from Scotsgap,  and  ended in September 1952 and it closed completely in 1966 - few traces of this route now remain.

Facilities
In December 2011, a self-service FastTicket machine was installed by Northern Rail for use outside the hours of operation of the ticket office (06:40 -12:40, Mondays to Saturdays only). Pre-purchased tickets can now also be collected from Morpeth.  The ticket office is located on the eastern side of the line in the main station building, which also has a taxi office and toilets.  The opposite (northbound) platform has a waiting shelter and the two are linked by a subway with lifts for wheelchair and mobility impaired users.  Train running information is supplied via timetable posters and digital display screens.

A £2.4 million redevelopment of the station was approved in October 2016 and was started in October 2018 - this has seen the main buildings refurbished and the portico entrance modernised to incorporate a cafeteria, expanded ticket office and upgraded toilets.  of office space has been created for local small businesses. The exterior of the station has been restored to Benjamin Green's original design, including the reinstatement of 15 tall chimney pots. The project was led by Greater Morpeth Development Trust and Northumberland County Council, with financial support from the Railway Heritage Trust, Network Rail, Northern and the National Lottery Heritage Fund. The refurbishment was completed in September 2020 and opened by Andy Savage, executive director of the Railway Heritage Trust.

Services
Services from Morpeth are currently operating to a reduced timetable, owing to the ongoing COVID-19 pandemic. There is also currently a consultation in place, which could see stopping services to and from Morpeth, as well as neighbouring Alnmouth for Alnwick and Berwick-upon-Tweed, significantly altered from the May 2022 timetable change.

CrossCountry
As of the May 2021 timetable change, there are four trains per day heading north towards Edinburgh Waverley. Heading south, there are five trains per day (weekday) to Birmingham New Street via Sheffield , one of which continues to Plymouth, with a further three trains running as far as Bristol Temple Meads. On a Saturday, a single train operates to Bristol Temple Meads. On Sunday, four trains run to Birmingham New Street, with one continuing to Plymouth, and two running as far as Bristol Temple Meads.

Rolling stock used: Class 220 Voyager and Class 221 Voyager

London North Eastern Railway

Rolling stock used: Class 800 Azuma and Class 801 Azuma

Lumo
In October 2021, Lumo commenced the operation of a twice-daily service between London King's Cross and Edinburgh Waverley.

Rolling stock used: Class 803 AT300

Northern Trains
As of the December 2021 timetable change, there is an hourly service between Newcastle and Morpeth. Most services extend to Carlisle via Hexham. At peak times, two trains per day (excluding Sunday) extend to Chathill.

Rolling stock used: Class 156 Super Sprinter and Class 158 Express Sprinter

TransPennine Express
As of the May 2021 timetable change, there is a twice-daily service between Liverpool Lime Street and Edinburgh Waverley via Newcastle. Prior to the COVID-19 pandemic, the service operated north of Newcastle at an hourly frequency.

In September 2021, TransPennine Express announced that they would be introducing a five return trains per weekday semi-fast service between Newcastle and Edinburgh from December 2021, which will call at Morpeth.

Rolling stock used: Class 802 Nova 1

References

Bibliography

External links

Railway stations in Northumberland
DfT Category E stations
Former North Eastern Railway (UK) stations
Railway stations in Great Britain opened in 1847
Railway stations served by CrossCountry
Railway stations served by London North Eastern Railway
Railway stations served by Lumo
Northern franchise railway stations
Railway stations served by TransPennine Express
Railway station
1847 establishments in England
John and Benjamin Green buildings and structures